The Women's super combined competition of the 2018 Winter Paralympics was held at Jeongseon Alpine Centre,
South Korea. The competition took place on 13 March 2018.

Medal table

Visually impaired
In the downhill visually impaired, the athlete with a visual impairment has a sighted guide. The two skiers are considered a team, and dual medals are awarded.

The super-G was started at 09:30 and the slalom was started at 15:00.

Standing
The super-G was started at 10:05 and the slalom was started at 15:22.

Sitting
The super-G was started at 10:40 and the slalom was started at 15:42.

See also
Alpine skiing at the 2018 Winter Olympics

References

Women's super combined
Para